Brødrene på Uglegaarden is a 1967 Danish comedy film directed by Ib Mossin and Alice O'Fredericks. It was O'Fredericks final film as a director.

Cast
 Astrid Villaume - Dora
 Kjeld Jacobsen - Anders, the Innkeeper
 Bertel Lauring - Karl
 Baard Owe - Viggo
 Erik Kühnau - Thomas
 Ejner Federspiel - Christian Thorup
 Ib Mossin - Henrik Thorup
 Gunnar Lemvigh - Købmand Jespersen
 Anna-Louise Lefèvre - Birthe Jespersen
 Henry Lohmann - Lars Mathisen
 Christian Arhoff - Hans
 Helge Kjærulff-Schmidt - Landpostbud
 Karen Wegener - Sara
 Lili Heglund - Katrine
 Niels Hemmingsen - Mikkel
 Folmer Rubæk - Peter Gevær
 Marianne Kjærulff-Schmidt - Gerda

External links

1967 films
1960s Danish-language films
1967 comedy films
Films directed by Alice O'Fredericks
Films scored by Sven Gyldmark
ASA Filmudlejning films
Danish comedy films